The Army Black Knights softball team represents the United States Military Academy in NCAA Division I college softball.  The team participates in the Patriot League. The Black Knights are currently led by head coach Cheryl Milligan. The team plays its home games at Army Softball Complex located on the university's campus.

Year-by-year results

Roster
As of January 5, 2014.

See also
List of NCAA Division I softball programs

References

External links